Soa de Muse (born January 31, 1989) is a French drag performer best known for participating in the first season of Drag Race France.

Early life 
Soa de Muse was born in Villepinte, Seine-Saint-Denis, a suburb of Paris, France. At the age of 15, de Muse moved to Martinique with their parents, where they remained through their high school years, and first discovered a love for theater.

At the age of 20, Soa returned to continental France to study, at their parents' urging. They initially pursued a degree in literature, then switched to theater studies. It was during the latter program that de Muse decided to pursue performance full time, and ultimately terminated her studies: "I realized that I shouldn't be sitting, listening to someone talking ... I had to do the scene [myself]."

Career 
Before appearing on Drag Race France, Soa worked as a burlesque performer at Madame Arthur, a historic Parisian drag venue open since 1946.

In March 2021, Soa participated in the "109 Mariannes" exhibition, curated by France's then-Secretary of State for Gender Equality, Marlène Schiappa, to mark International Women's Rights Day. Portraits of de Muse, and 108 other participants selected to "celebrate the diversity of France" in the image of national symbol Marianne, were displayed in front of the Panthéon for one week.

Soa de Muse competed on the inaugural season of Drag Race France, a spin-off franchise of the original series RuPaul's Drag Race. Soa was the first challenge winner of the series, in the episode "Bonjour, Bonjour, Bonjour."

Elsewhere in 2022, Soa opened their own cabaret in Paris, called "La Bouche," in collaboration with three other local performers.

Public image and artistry 
Soa's drag is heavily inspired by their Afro-Martinican culture. During their time on Drag Race France, Soa shared a desire to highlight "the West Indian community which is a little invisible" as well as contribute "a battle cry to say that we are here now." They have also stated a desire to some day return to perform in their native Martinique.

Personal life 
Soa de Muse identifies as non-binary, having stated in a 2021 interview that they identify with "neither man nor woman, just universelle. I just am who I am."

Soa is a drag sister of Honey Mahogany, a San Francisco-based drag performer, activist and competitor in RuPaul's Drag Race season 5, through their shared drag mother Alotta Boutté — a connection that both queens discovered via Instagram comments.

Discography

Singles

As a featured artist

Filmography

Film

Television

Web series

References 

Living people
Drag Race France contestants
French drag queens
Non-binary drag performers
French non-binary people
1989 births